Uza. Aishath Azima Shakoor was the first female attorney general of the Maldives. She was the Legal advisor and appointed as the Legal Affairs Minister at president's office in the presidency of President Abdulla Yameen. 

Azima was formerly a deputy at the Ministry of Home Affairs. She was an appointed member of parliament appointed by the President Gayoom and President of Women's Wing of Dhivehi Rayyithunge Party (DRP). 

She also served as the Minister of Gender Family and Human Rights, Her predecessor as Attorney General was Dr. Hassan Saeed, who brought considerable reform within the existing legal framework. She was succeeded by Uza. Fathimath Dhiyana Saeed. Uza. Aishath Azima Shakoor remained as attorney general till the end of the presidential term of president Maumoon Abdhul Gayyoom and was later appointed by President Dr. Mohamed Waheed Hassan upon him taking oath of office and remained in office till 2013.

References

Year of birth missing (living people)
Living people
Maldivian lawyers
Attorneys General of the Maldives
Women government ministers of the Maldives
Women lawyers
21st-century Maldivian women politicians
21st-century Maldivian politicians